Thomas William Miller (March 31, 1947 – September 25, 2017) was a Canadian professional ice hockey forward who played 118 games in the National Hockey League for the New York Islanders and Detroit Red Wings between 1971 and 1974. He was also an NCAA Champion player at the University of Denver. He died of cancer in 2017.

Career statistics

Regular season and playoffs

Awards and honors

References

External links
 

1947 births
2017 deaths
Canadian ice hockey centres
Cincinnati Swords players
Detroit Red Wings players
Fort Worth Wings players
Guelph Royals players
Ice hockey people from Ontario
Kitchener Rangers players
NCAA men's ice hockey national champions
New Haven Nighthawks players
New York Islanders players
Omaha Knights (CHL) players
Sportspeople from Kitchener, Ontario